Download Accelerator Plus (also referred to as DAP) is a download manager for Microsoft Windows and Mac OS X. It uses multipart download to increase speed, creating multiple connections of different file segments to speed up the download. Download Accelerator Plus works by splitting files into smaller pieces and automatically seeking faster mirrors. Simultaneously, it can also get a file from several sites.

Download Accelerator Plus comes in three editions: DAP Free, DAP Premium and DAP for Mac.

References

External links

Download managers
Shareware